This is a list of monuments in Parsa District, Nepal as officially recognized by and available through the website of the Department of Archaeology, Nepal. Parsa is a district of Province No. 2 and is located in southern Nepal. Hindu temples are the main attraction of this district.

List of monuments

|}

See also 
 List of monuments in Province No. 2
 List of monuments in Nepal

References 

Parsa